Luciola is a genus of "flashing" fireflies (family Lampyridae), especially well known from Japan. They are often called "Japanese fireflies", but their members range farther into Asia and reach southern Europe (Italy, France, Spain, Portugal, among other countries) and Africa. This genus is traditionally held to extend to Australia, but these species do not seem to belong herein (see below for details).

Biological description
Unlike some other fireflies, the females of Luciola are fully winged. Ecologically, the genus is remarkable in that the larvae of several species are aquatic. The adults of the typical Luciola are similar to those of Atyphella which was formerly included in this genus. They can be easily distinguished by the males' aedeagus however, which in Luciola proper has large lateral lobes that do not taper and have elongated, slender and flattened smaller lobes along their ventral margin. The middle lobe of the males' aedeagus is very slim and has a point before the tip. By contrast, the Australian group resembles Pyrophanes in its lateral lobes of the aedeagus being small and not visible from beneath. But unlike in Pyrophanes, the sheath of the aedeagus lacks paraprocts, and the seventh ventrite of the abdomen lacks the hairy lobes and points at its hind margin.

Two Japanese species of Luciola, collectively known as hotaru (蛍), are significant in Japanese culture and folklore. They are symbols of the hitodama (人魂 or 人玉), the souls of the newly-dead. See also the explanations at the article on the movie Hotaru no Haka ("Grave of the Fireflies") for a discussion of the cultural significance of the hotaru.

Systematics 

Luciola in the narrow sense appears to be most closely related to a rather basal group of Luciolinae, including Bourgeoisia and Lampyroidea and Hotaria. Their relationships are not well resolved and Hotaria is sometimes merged with Luciola. On the other hand, the genera Atyphella and Pygoluciola, which for some time were included in Luciola, is now again recognized as distinct.

The internal systematics of Luciola are somewhat in need of revision, and it is not certain whether these species are all correctly assigned to this genus. For example, the Australian species appear to be separate and not very closely related to the other members of this genus, but rather to Colophotia, Pteroptyx and Pyrophanes. Whether the larvae of these can be recognized by the share soft terga lacking paranota, or whether this is a plesiomorphic trait also present in other Luciolinae, remains to be determined.

L. deplanata might be worthy of separation in a monotypic genus Photuroluciola.

But considering the fact that many species remain essentially unstudied, a 2008 review of the genus concluded that:
"A phylogenetic analysis [...] may give indications for subdivisions within Luciola. However, there are elements of the cart and the horse here – which should come first? Break up Luciola based on narrow analyses, or wait until more analyses are available? It is our contention that those Luciolinae species which do not fit elsewhere should either be described as Luciola sp. or remain undescribed until such time as phylogenetic analyses indicate a repeatable pattern of subdivisions with Luciola. Any other action would be, in our opinion, premature."

In 2010, leii, ficta, hydrophila and lateralis were transferred to the genus Aquatica.

Selected species

 Luciola anceyi – (大端黑螢)
 Luciola bourgeoisi
 Luciola capensis Fabricius, 1775
 Luciola cerata Olivier, 1911 (黑翅螢)
 Luciola chinensis
 Luciola cowleyi
 Luciola cruciata – genjibotaru (源氏蛍), includes L. vitticollis.
 Luciola curtithorax
 Luciola davidis Olivier, 1895 (Pygoluciola?)
 Luciola dejeani
 Luciola deplanata (Photuroluciola?)
 Luciola discicollis
 Luciola dubia
 Luciola filiformis
 Luciola (filiformis) yayeyamana
 Luciola fissicollis
 Luciola flava
 Luciola flavida
 Luciola fletcheri
 Luciola fukienensis
 Luciola gorhami
 Luciola impedita
 Luciola italica (Linnaeus, 1767) (including L. pedemontana)
 Luciola japonica
 Luciola judaica
 Luciola kagiana
 Luciola kervillei
 Luciola klapperichi
 Luciola kuroiwae (Pygoluciola?)
 Luciola laticollis
 Luciola limbalis
 Luciola lusitanica (Charpentier, 1825)
 Luciola mongolica
 Luciola nitescens
 Luciola novaki Müller, 1946
 Luciola ovalis
 Luciola owadai

 Luciola picea
 Luciola picticollis
 Luciola pieli
 Luciola praeusta
 Luciola roseicollis
 Luciola satoi
 Luciola stigmaticollis
 Luciola substriata
 Luciola terminalis
 Luciola trilucida
 Luciola trivandrensis

 Luciola vespertina

The distinct Australian group includes species such as:

 Luciola australis
 Luciola flavicollis
 Luciola nigra
 Luciola orapallida

The species undulata was recently removed to Atyphella, and guigliae, hamulata, kinabalua, stylifer and witmeri were reestablished as Pygoluciola.

Footnotes

References 

  (2006): A phylogenetic reassessment of the rare S. E. Asian firefly genus Pygoluciola Wittmer (Coleoptera: Lampyridae: Luciolinae). Raffles Bulletin of Zoology 53(1): 21–48. PDF fulltext
  (2002): A description of larvae and redescription of adults of the firefly Pteroptyx valida Olivier in Selangor, Malaysia (Coleoptera: Lampyridae: Luciolinae), with notes of Luciolinae larvae. Raffles Bulletin of Zoology 50(1): 101–109. PDF fulltext
  (2008): Taxonomy and behaviour of lucioline fireflies (Coleoptera: Lampyridae: Luciolinae) with redefinition and new species of Pygoluciola Wittmer from mainland China and review of Luciola LaPorte. Zootaxa 1733: 1–44. PDF abstract
  (2010): Aquatica gen. nov. from mainland China with a description of Aquatica Wuhana sp. nov. (Coleoptera: Lampyridae: Luciolinae). Zootaxa 2530: 1–18. PDF abstract
  (2007): Phylogeny of North American fireflies (Coleoptera: Lampyridae): Implications for the evolution of light signals. Mol. Phylogenet. Evol. 45(1): 33–49.   (HTML abstract)

Lampyridae
Lampyridae genera
Bioluminescent insects
Taxa named by François-Louis Laporte, comte de Castelnau